Michel Renggli (born 19 March 1980) is a retired Swiss footballer who last played as midfielder for FC Luzern in the Swiss Super League.

External links
 Profile at weltfussball

1980 births
Living people
Grasshopper Club Zürich players
FC Thun players
SC Kriens players
FC Wil players
FC Luzern players
Swiss men's footballers
Swiss Super League players
Association football midfielders